General elections were held in the Bahamas in September 1729, the first elections in the territory.

Background
In August 1729, new Governor Woodes Rogers was instructed by King George II to create a 24-member General Assembly for the Bahamas. Rogers issued a proclamation on 8 September, ordering eligible voters to meet at polling places during the next two weeks. The reforms had been planned by the previous Governor George Phenney and authorised in July 1728.

Electoral system
The General Assembly had 24 members elected from five constituencies; eight representatives were elected in Nassau, whilst Eastern District, Western District, Eleuthera and Harbour Island all had four representatives. Voting was restricted to around 250 white men aged over 21, and the elections took place between 12 and 20 September. In Nassau the elections were held at the house of Samuel Lawford, in the Eastern District they took place at Samuel Frith's house, and in Western District they took place at the house of John Watkins.

Results

Aftermath
The General Assembly met for the first time on 29 September at the house of Samuel Lawford. John Colebrooke was elected as its first speaker. It was dissolved on 7 December 1730 by the Governor after it voted against continuing to pay his £200 salary and also voted out the Speaker, who was sympathetic to the Governor.

References

1729 in politics
1729
1729 in the Bahamas
18th century in the Bahamas